WRMS may refer to:

 W Ross MacDonald School for the deaf blind in Brantford Ontario Canada 

 Microsoft Windows Rights Management Services
 WRMS (AM), a radio station (790 AM) licensed to Beardstown, Illinois, United States
 WRMS-FM, a radio station (94.3 FM) licensed to Beardstown, Illinois, United States
 Washburn Rural Middle School, a middle school in Topeka, Kansas, United States
 Wood River Middle School, a middle school in Hailey, Idaho, United States
 Windemere Ranch Middle School, a middle school in San Ramon, California, United States.